Carpatho-Russian or Carpathian Russian may refer to:

 American Carpatho-Russian Orthodox Diocese, an Eastern Orthodox ecclesial body
 Russian minority in Carpathian regions of modern Ukraine
 As a dated term for Rusyns

See also
 Russian (disambiguation)
 Carpatho-Ruthenian (disambiguation)